The Copa San Isidro de Curuguaty (English: San Isidro de Curuguaty Cup) is a football (soccer) tournament of regional character played between the champions of the Campeonato Nacional de Interligas organized by the Unión del Fútbol del Interior (Paraguay) and the Copa Nacional de Selecciones del Interior organized by the Organización del Fútbol del Interior (Uruguay).

History 
The tournament was created by Eusebio Baeza, former executive of Pluna and the Asociación Uruguaya de Fútbol, and Arturo Filartiga Candia, member of the Asociación Paraguaya de Fútbol. The tournament is played every two years since 1978 with home and away games. If teams tie in points and goals the game is decided by penalty kicks.

Winners 

Notas:
[1] Colonia participated instead of Melo. Colonia declared champion after mutual agreement with Ypacarai.
[2] Paranaense winners after Maldonado Interior had five red cards in the game.
[3] Durazno participated instead of Mercedes.

Titles per country and team

See also

Campeonato Nacional de Interligas

External links
Copa San Isidro de Curuguaty on GIEFI
Copa San Isidro de Curuguaty at RSSSF

S